Aunt Ruby's German Green heirloom tomatoes are a cultivar originating with Ruby Arnold (d 1997), of Greeneville, Tennessee, but achieving great Seed Savers popularity. They are, as the name implies, "green" tomatoes, which really means they are a greenish yellow when fully ripe, but are still tasty when picked early.

The Plant
This tomato cultivar is an indeterminate plant that produces large beefsteak fruit of especially irregular shapes, in somewhere between 69 and 80 days. This fruit won the Heirloom Garden Show's taste test, in 2003.

See also
 List of tomato cultivars

References

Heirloom tomato cultivars